Section Peak is a small, but prominent sandstone knob at the north end of the Lichen Hills, Victoria Land. It provided for the geologist one of the few sections seen in sedimentary beds. Mapped and named by the northern party of New Zealand Geological Survey Antarctic Expedition (NZGSAE), 1962–63.

References 
Mountains of Victoria Land
Pennell Coast